The 2020 Liberty Flames football team represented Liberty University in the 2020 NCAA Division I FBS football season. They were led by second-year head coach Hugh Freeze and played their home games at Williams Stadium. The Flames competed as an FBS independent.

Schedule
Liberty had games scheduled against Bowling Green, North Carolina A&T, UConn, and UMass, which were canceled due to the COVID-19 pandemic. These games were partially replaced with new match-ups announced with Coastal Carolina and North Alabama. The games against NC State and Syracuse were rescheduled for different days for the 2020 season.

Because of an increased number of COVID-19 cases within the football program, Liberty University's medical staff decided to pause its football team's activities and cancel the game with Coastal Carolina in Conway, South Carolina, scheduled for December 5. Ironically, the two teams were selected to play in the Cure Bowl at season's end, a match-up that Liberty won.

Schedule Source:

Rankings

Game summaries

at Western Kentucky

FIU

North Alabama

Louisiana–Monroe

at Syracuse

Southern Miss

at Virginia Tech

The game featured a wild finish as Liberty got into field goal range with 8 seconds left to go in a 35-35 tie. Facing a 4th and 6 at the Virginia Tech 41-yard line, disaster appeared to strike when Liberty 59-yard field goal attempt was blocked and returned for a touchdown by Virginia Tech's Jermaine Waller with no time remaining. However, Virginia Tech had called a timeout to try to Icing the kicker before the play. Liberty then decided to go for it on fourth down, and got a 8-yard pass completion for a first down after Virginia Tech mistakenly thought that Flames would try a Hail Mary and went to a prevent defense. With 5 seconds remaining, the Flames converted a 51-yard field goal to win the game.

Western Carolina

at NC State

at Coastal Carolina

References

Liberty
Liberty Flames football seasons
Cure Bowl champion seasons
Liberty Flames football